YMI may refer to:

Yeh Mera India, 2008 movie
Young Men's Institute, Catholic organization
Young Men's Institute Building in Asheville, North Carolina, United States
YMI Jeans, American company
Yamaha Motor India